Macrocheilus ferruginipes is a species of ground beetle in the subfamily Anthiinae. It was described by Fairmaire in 1892.

References

Anthiinae (beetle)
Beetles described in 1892